The 1962–63 Allsvenskan was the 29th season of the top division of Swedish handball. 10 teams competed in the league. Redbergslids IK won the league and claimed their sixth Swedish title. LUGI and IF Guif were relegated.

League table

References 

Swedish handball competitions